The MBM Tourismo was a very low-production (probably only two were built) automobile sold by Peter Monteverdi. Monteverdi's small company MBM (standing for Monteverdi Binningen Motors) mainly focused on competition, but a "few" sports cars were also produced.

The car's body was bought from England, where a company called Heron Plastics had developed a fiberglass sports car called the Europa. It had a backbone chassis and coil sprung wishbone front suspension, with a Triumph Herald swing axle at the rear, although it is unknown what may have been different in the MBMs. The engine was a 997 cc Ford Anglia 105E unit, as was usual for the Heron as well. A 1961 MBM Tourismo currently resides in the Swiss Transport Museum in Luzern Switzerland

In 1960 an open two-seat sports car called the MBM Sport meant for competition was shown.
In Case you didn't Know Artist "Giz" Started the drift Series Gizmo Tourismo

References

See also
Peter Monteverdi

Tourismo